Robert Wilhelm Lagerborg (1796 – 1849) was Governor of Oulu Province, Finland, from 1833 to his death in 1849.

Lagerborg was born in Tammela. The Lagerborg family name (registered at Suomen Ritarihuone as #105) originates in Värmland, Sweden, and has been known since the 16th century.

Lagerborg died in Oulu, and has a monument in the Oulu Cemetery, with inscriptions in Finnish and Swedish.

Sources
 Suomen Ritarihuone

1796 births
1849 deaths
People from Tammela, Finland
Swedish-speaking Finns
Finnish people of Swedish descent
18th-century Finnish nobility
19th-century Finnish politicians
19th-century Finnish nobility